The Maldives women's national football team was first formed in 2003.  The team represents Maldives in international women's football and thus falls under the governance of the Football Association of Maldives.  The team played its first official international match against Myanmar on 1 October 2004.

Team image

Home stadium
The Maldives women's national football team plays their home matches on the National Football Stadium.

Results and fixtures

The following is a list of match results in the last 12 months, as well as any future matches that have been scheduled.

Legend

2022

2023

Coaching staff

Manager history
 Mohamed Athif (2018)
 Ahmed Nashid (2019)

Players

Current squad 
The following players were named on 13 July 2021 for the xxx tournament.

Caps and goals accurate up to and including 13 July 2021.

Recent call-ups
The following players have been called up to a squad in the past 12 months.

Previous squads
Asian Games
2018 Asian Games – squads

Records

Active players in bold, statistics correct as of 2020.

Most capped players

Top goalscorers

Competitive record

FIFA Women's World Cup

*Draws include knockout matches decided on penalty kicks.

AFC Women's Asian Cup
{| class="wikitable" style="text-align: center; width:50%;"
|-
!colspan=10|AFC Women's Asian Cup record
|-
!Year
!Result
!GP
!W 
!D*
!L
!GF
!GA
!GD
|- 
|-
|  1975 to  2003||colspan=9|did not enter
|-
|| 2006||colspan=9|did not qualify
|-
|  2008||colspan=9|did not enter
|-
|  2010||colspan=9|did not qualify
|-
|  2014||colspan=9 rowspan=2|did not enter
|-
|  2018
|-
|  2022||colspan=9|did not qualify
|-
|Total||0/20||–||–||–||–||–||–||–
|}*Draws include knockout matches decided on penalty kicks.Asian Games

SAFF Women's Championship

South Asian Games

AFF Women's Championship

Honours
Regional
South Asian Games
 Bronze Medal:'' 2019

See also

Sport in Maldives
Football in Maldives
Women's football in Maldives
Maldives women's national football team results

References

External links
  of the Maldives women's national football team

 
Maldives
National